Maggie is a common short form of the name Magdalena, Magnolia, Margaret.

Maggie may refer to:

People

Women 

 Maggie Adamson, Scottish musician
 Maggie Aderin-Pocock (born 1968), British scientist
 Maggie Alderson (born 1959), Australian author
 Maggie Alphonsi (born 1983), English rugby union player
 Maggie Anderson (born 1948), American poet
 Maggie Anderson (activist) (born 1971), American activist
 Maggie Atkinson (born 1956), English educator
 Maggie Baird (born 1959), American actress
 Maggie Bandur (born 1974), American television writer
 Maggie Barrie (born 1996), Sierra Leonean sprinter
 Maggie Barry (born 1959), New Zealand politician
 Maggie Batson (born 2003), American actress
 Maggie Baylis (1912–1997), American graphic designer
 Maggie Beer (born 1945), Australian cook
 Maggie Behle (born 1980), American Paralympic alpine skier
 Maggie Bell (born 1945), Scottish vocalist
 Maggie Benedict (born 1981), South African actress
 Maggie Betts, American filmmaker
 Maggie Björklund, Danish guitarist
 Maggie Black (1930–2015), American ballet teacher
 Maggie Blanc, American television producer
 Maggie De Block (born 1962), Belgian politician
 Maggie Blye (1942–2016), American actress
 Maggie Borg (1952–2004), Maltese activist
 Maggie Boyle (1956–2014), English singer
 Maggie Bridges (born 1992), American beauty pageant titleholder
 Maggie Brown (born 1948), American playwright
 Maggie Brown (singer) (born 1963), American singer
 Maggie Browne (1864–1937), English author
 Maggie Butt, British poet
 Maggie Calloway (1910–2000), Filipino actress
 Maggie Campbell-Culver, English historian
 Maggie Carey (born 1975), American director
 Maggie Carlton (born 1957), American politician
 Maggie Carver (born 1964), English businesswoman
 Maggie Cassella, American-Canadian actress
 Maggie Chan Man Yee (born 1975), Hong Kong long-distance runner
 Maggie Chapman (born 1979), Zimbabwean-Scottish politician
 Maggie Chapman (singer) (born 1997), American singer-songwriter
 Maggie Chen (born 1957), Chinese actress
 Maggie Cheung (born 1964), Hong Kong actress
 Maggie Cheung Ho-yee (born 1969), Hong Kong actress
 Maggie Chiang (born 1980), Taiwanese singer
 Maggie Civantos (born 1984), Spanish actress
 Maggie Cline (1857–1934), American singer
 Maggie Cogan (born 1943), American resident
 Maggie Coles-Lyster (born 1999), Canadian cyclist
 Maggie Collins, Australian announcer
 Maggie Cronin, Irish actress
 Maggie Crotty (1948–2020), Democratic member
 Maggie Cusack, English professor
 Maggie Eckford (born c. 1986), uses the stage name Ruelle (singer), American singer-songwriter
 Maggie Culver Fry, American poet
 Maggie Davis, British politician
 Maggie Dence (born 1942), Australian film actress
 Maggie Dent (born 1955), Australian author
 Maggie Diaz (1925–2016), Australian photographer
 Maggie Dixon (1977–2006), American basketball player
 Maggie Doyne (born 1987), American philanthropist
 Maggie Edmond (born 1946), Australian architect
 Maggie Estep (1963–2014), American writer
 Maggie Ferguson (born 1952), Australian violinist
 Maggie Fitzgibbon (1929–2020), Australian actress
 Maggie Flecknoe (born 1983), American voice actress
 Maggie Friedman, American screenwriter
 Maggie Furey (1955–2016), British writer
 Maggie Gallagher (born 1960), American writer
 Maggie Gee (disambiguation)
 Maggie Geha (born 1988), American actress
 Maggie George, American educator
 Maggie Gobran (born 1949), Coptic Orthodox lady
 Maggie Gordon-Smith, British track cyclist
 Maggie Grace (born 1983), American actress noted for her role in the TV series Lost
 Maggie Gray, American set decorator
 Maggie Greenwald (born 1955), American filmmaker
 Maggie Gripenberg (1881–1976), Finnish dancer
 Maggie Gyllenhaal (born 1977), American actress
 Maggie Haberman (born 1973), American journalist
 Maggie Hadleigh-West (born 1958), American filmmaker
 Maggie Hall (1853–1888), Irish prostitute
 Maggie Hamilton (1867–1952), Scottish artist
 Maggie Han (born 1959), American actress
 Maggie Haney (born 1978), American coach
 Maggie Hannan (born 1962), English poet
 Maggie Hassan (born 1958), American attorney and politician
 Maggie Hathaway (1911–2001), American singer
 Maggie Helwig (born 1961), Canadian poet
 Maggie Hemingway (1946–1993), British novelist
 Maggie Hickey (born 1946), Australian politician
 Maggie Hill (1898–1949), English career criminal
 Maggie Hogan (born 1979), American Olympic athlete
 Maggie Holland, English singer-songwriter
 Maggie Jeffus (born 1934), Democratic educator
 Maggie Jenkins (born 2001), New Zealand footballer
 Maggie Jones (actress) (1934–2009), British actress
 Maggie Jones (blues musician) (1894–1940), American singer
 Maggie Jones, Baroness Jones of Whitchurch (born 1955), British politician
 Maggie Elizabeth Jones (born 2003), American actress
 Maggie Hardy Knox (born 1965), American billionaire businesswoman
 Maggie Lindemann (born 1998), American singer
 Maggie Kirkpatrick (born 1941), Australian actress
 Maggie McNamara (1928–1978), American actress
 Maggie Noach (1949–2006), English literary agent
 Maggie Nichols (gymnast) (born 1997), American gymnast
 Maggie Blue O'Hara (born 1975), Canadian actress
 Maggie Q (born 1979), American actress Margaret Quigley
 Maggie Qin (born 1989), Chinese actress
 Maggie Reilly (born 1956), Scottish singer
 Maggie de la Riva (born 1942), Filipina film actress
 Maggie Rogers (born 1994), American musician
 Maggie Siff (born 1974), American actress
 Maggie Smith (born 1934), English actress
 Maggie Smith (poet), American poet, freelance writer, and editor
 Maggie Tabberer (born 1936), Australian fashion personality
 Margaret Thatcher (1925–2013), the first female UK prime minister
 Maggie de Vries (born 1961), Canadian writer
 Maggie Axe Wachacha (1894–1993), Eastern Band Cherokee woman

Fictional characters 

 Captain Maggie Beckett, from the American TV series Sliders
 Maggie Blackamoor, character from the British comedy sketch programme Little Britain
 Maggie Cadabby, Abby Cadabby's mother in Sesame Street
 Maggie Doyle, from the Australian police drama Blue Heelers
 Maggie Greene, from the American comic book and TV series The Walking Dead
 Maggie O'Connell, one of the main characters of the TV series Northern Exposure
 Margaret "Maggie" Pollitt (also called "Maggie the Cat"), from Tennessee Williams' 1955 play, Cat on a Hot Tin Roof.
 Maggie Pesky, cartoon character in the TV series The Buzz on Maggie
 Maggie Horton, on the American soap opera Days of Our Lives
 Maggie Sawyer, police officer in The CW's Supergirl series portrayed by Floriana Lima
 Maggie Schultz, title character in the 1990 children's book Muggie Maggie by Beverly Cleary
 Maggie Simpson, on the television series The Simpsons
 Maggie Sloane, from the Australian TV series A Country Practice
 Maggie Stone, on the American soap opera All My Children
 Maggie Walsh, on the TV series Buffy the Vampire Slayer
 Maggie, a main character in the American comic strip Bringing Up Father
 Maggie, the Cardcaptors name for the Cardcaptor Sakura character Maki Matsumoto, voiced by Nicole Oliver
 Maggie, the human protagonist of the Canadian animated TV series Maggie and the Ferocious Beast
 Maggie, a supporting character in the 2003 Japanese anime Gungrave
 Maggie, a cow from Disney's 2004 film Home on the Range
 Maggie Rag Doll, a fictional toy character in the Wee Sing 1988 video: Grandpa's Magical Toys
 Margarita Luisa "Maggie" Chascarrillo, a character in the comics series Love and Rockets
 Margarita "Maggie" Emilia Vera, character in Charmed

Animals 

 Maggie the Macaque, a monkey from the Bowmanville Zoo, Toronto, Canada, known for making hockey predictions

See also 

 Maggy (disambiguation)

English feminine given names
Given names derived from gemstones
Hypocorisms